Samuel Alejandro García Sepúlveda (born 28 December 1987) is a Mexican politician affiliated with the Citizens' Movement party and current Governor of Nuevo León. He previously served as a deputy and senator for Nuevo León.

References

1987 births
Living people
21st-century Mexican politicians
Citizens' Movement (Mexico) politicians
Governors of Nuevo León
Members of the Chamber of Deputies (Mexico)
Members of the Senate of the Republic (Mexico)
Politicians from Monterrey
Senators of the LXIV and LXV Legislatures of Mexico